New Deal is a Chilean centre-left political movement, founded in 2020 by the Liberal Party and former members of Democratic Revolution, all former members of the Broad Front.

Authorities

Deputies

References

External links
 Official site

2020 establishments in Chile
Political parties established in 2020
Political parties in Chile